The Philosophy of Eating is a book on nutrition by American homeopathic physician Albert J. Bellows (1804-1869). The book was first published in 1867 with the posthumous edition descriptor line Late Professor of Chemistry, Physiology, and Hygiene, and reprinted in later years to the current Philosophy of Eating. Entered, according to Act of Congress, in the year 1867, by Bellows, in the Clerk's Office of the District Court of the District Massachusetts stereotyped at the Boston Stereotype Foundry.

Overview

Bellow's The Philosophy of Eating discusses the principles of nutrition, major food groups and role of diet in health and disease for the lay audience.  The book was very popular and went through sixteen editions in America from its first issue at New York in 1867 to the 16th Boston edition in 1887.

An introductory section by Bellows dedicates this edition to "The Five Thousand Ladies" who attended his lectures from 1838 to 1858.

In the preface, Bellows states that we have excellent practical treatises on Agriculture and Horticulture, and every intelligent farmer or gardener may learn what element is deficient, in order to cultivate his grapes, his vegetables, or his grains; and having also chemical analyses of these fruits and grains, and of the materials from which to obtain his deficient elements, he has the means of adapting his soil to all desirable productions.

A follow on work to this book How Not to Be Sick guided the reader into a deeper set of specifics started with this original work. The book attributes all diseases to improper eating.

About the author

Albert J. Bellows was born at Groton on July 28, 1804. He graduated from Harvard Medical School in 1829, became a homeopathic physician and authored books on dietetics. Bellows died at Boston on December 18, 1869.

See also

 Philosophy of eating

References

External links

 The Philosophy of Eating (1867) (at Internet Archive)
 The Philosophy of Eating. by Albert J. Bellows, M.D. (E-book available for free, Google Play Store)

1867 books
Books about food and drink
Food and drink culture
Philosophy books